The Compagnie des Transports Strasbourgeois (CTS) is the company responsible for the comprehensive public transport network of the Eurométropole de Strasbourg, the urban community of the French city of Strasbourg.

The CTS currently operates all six lines of the Tramway de Strasbourg and the bus network with the eight associated Park and Ride facilities, on behalf of the Eurométropole de Strasbourg. It also runs other services through its subsidiary Compagnie des Transports du Bas-Rhin (CTBR) and on behalf of the Conseil départemental du Bas-Rhin. These comprise 27 coach lines,  of which 9 serve Strasbourg and participate in the Vélhop cycle network.

History

Establishment 

On 22 July 1878 the company opened its first carriage line. It continued to expand its network, with financial support from banks such as the Straehling-Valentin bank, and also the development of a local interest in the activity of the railway.

Electrification of the tram network did not start until 1894, in partnership with the town and AEG. The first lines were electrified the following year at the 1895 .

In 1912 the city of Strasbourg became the major shareholder of the company with 51% ownership. It was the start of its status as a public-private partnership. The city also granted an exclusive contract to run the network and construct any future lines., which gave the city power to control Strasbourg's development.

World War I 

The declaration of war in 1914 took most of the company's staff (over 500 men from a labour force of 540).  The business resorted to hiring over 260 women to keep the network running.

Between the wars 
At the end of the war, the network was heavily damaged and split in two: the outer-Rhine lines were transferred to the Republic of Baden in 1922. It was during this period that the Bas-Rhin invested in the society, which was facing financial difficulties.

Although the first bus only appeared in 1928, the tramway transported over 50 million passengers during 1930.  Despite that, traffic declined. The CTS turned towards tourism in 1932 with the creation of the  company, with luxury touring coaches.

World War II 

To address the shortage of fuel, the Trolleybus made its appearance in 1939 on the Roethig – Ostwald line.  The tram network served to evacuate Strasbourg so normal service stopped. Only the suburban network continued to run, to allow adequate provisioning of the French army. But the German authorities restarted the services when they took control of the city in June 1940. During the war, the tram network was one of the only methods on transport with a peak in usage, with nearly 73 million journeys in 1943. When Strasbourg became French again, the CTS faced a crisis, with a loss of human and material resources.

After World War II 
After the war, the authorities considered the reconstruction of the network. Between 1940 and 1950 it replaced two tramways with trolleybuses, and turned decisively to buses thereafter. Buses would be easier for the armed forces to commandeer if war broke out again, and the company could not afford new locomotives for the network.

In 1953, the company began to replace the urban tramways with bus lines. On 1 May 1960 the tramway made its last journey on the  line 4/14 (Neuhof Forest   Wacken), and finished dismantling the network, work which had progressed gradually since the end of the war. Freight had not travelled by tramway since April 1958, except for manure which was transported until 1960.

Tourist steam locomotives continued to use the line until 1988. An 030T Borsig T3 and a postal van, both classed as Monuments Historiques, are preserved by the CTS at their Kibitzenau depot.

Network renewal 

In spring 1962, the last trolleys were scrapped after circling the three lines 28 (Roethig - Ostwald), 5/15 (Place Broglie - Quartier de Quinze), and the 10 (the belt line). Dismantling the tramway caused a 20% drop in usage during the 1960s. The network was revolutionised in 1967 with the abolition of conductors. Their role was combined with that of the driver, so the drivers also collected the fares from the passengers. In 1976 the single fare began, and the urban lines were extended to the whole of the Urban Community of Strasbourg.

The CTS refocused on public transport and resold ASTRA and its dedicated freight vehicles. It was one of the first transport companies to introduce an Intelligent transportation system allowing the exchange of data between the vehicles and a central command centre.

Return of the tramway 

At the end of the 1980s, the municipality launched a project to add a new type of public transport. A metro system was the first choice, with the prominence of Véhicule Automatique Léger, but after the municipal elections of 1989, the new municipality decided to turn back to the tramway. The CTS were assigned to manage the project, to begin in January 1991. The Line A went into service on 26 November 1994.

The CTS attempted to associate a multitude of services with the tramway.  Since 1997, an airport shuttle bus has linked the airport with the tramway at Baggersee', cycle parks have been installed at certain stations etc.  In 1998, the Line A was extended from Baggersee as far as Illkirch-Lixenbuhl, and creating the embryonic Line D, doubling the length of Line A by adding the segment Rotonde - Étoile Polygone.

Lines B and C first saw daylight in September 2000.  Line B runs from Elsau and Hoenheim Station, and Line C is from Elsau to the Esplanade quarter.

A new type of ticketing was put in place in September 2004: the Badgeo card replaced the standard paper tickets on the urban routes.  It was joined by an intercity network in 2006.

Grid network and new energy sources 

Following the 2001 municipal elections, a new phase of network upgrades was approved. It was scheduled between 2006 and 2008, but several organisations and three individuals (including two elected Green councillors) appealed, and the work was delayed.

In December 2008, the first phase of the tram-train went into service, and the CTS stopped the airport shuttle, which was replaced by the TER Alsace's new service.

At the end of 2008, the CTS launched an experiment with a hybrid articulated bus: a Solaris Urbino 18.  This circled on Line 6 along with the diesel buses, allowing performance comparisons between the two engine types. After a year of circulation, the company judged the tests inconclusive and announced that it would not be acquiring further hybrid vehicles.

On 27 November 2010, the tramway network was upgraded with the creation of Line F between Elsau and the Place d'Islande and foreshadowing the tram-train, and Line C added a new segment from the station Gare Centrale to Neuhof Rudolphe Reuss. At the end of 2010, the city and the CTS filed a project to create a pneumatic tramway on the Wolfisheim – Vendenheim route via Strasbourg in the 2nd call for busway projects for Grenelle II
This plan was widely criticised by local associations, residents, and the municipality opposition.

In parallel with the announcement of abandoning hybrid fuel, the company decided to continue buying vehicles running on natural gas.  So, in November 2011, the Cronenbourg depot, which did not have facilities to accommodate natural gas buses, simultaneously equipped and put into circulation 30 gas Irisbus Citelis buses.

Corporate structure

Share capital 
The company capital (€5m) is shared:
 52.4% by the Communauté urbaine de Strasbourg (CUS)
 23.3% by the Conseil général du Bas-Rhin
 12.5% by the private company Transdev

Other minor shareholders include the Caisse des dépôts et consignations (parent company of Transdev) and Électricité de Strasbourg.

The board is more than 80% controlled by local collectives. Major board members select the chairman of the board: currently Roland Ries (Senator-Mayor of Strasbourg), the vice-president of the CUS since May 2008.

Workforce 
On 31 December 2010, the workforce numbered  including 971 drivers, compared to  employees (of which 935 were urban driver-conductors and 116 suburban) at 31 December 2003.

Financial structure 

A new range of fares was introduced in July 2010. The versement transport (VT) in the CUS has been fixed at 2% since 1 January 2011 (being 1.75% before).

Of the whole provision, revenue represented only , or 31.6%, and this included the receipts from the territorial collectivities.

But in 2009, assets included the suburban network, which today is run by a sister company, the CTBR.

Network

Tramway lines 

The current Strasbourg tramway network opened on 25 November 1994, serving the Urban Community of Strasbourg. It is the second longest tramway network in France, after the Lyon tramway.

It was the first tramway network in France to have low-floor trams. Rolling stock consists of 53 Eurotrams (manufactured by Bombardier Transportation), later augmented by 41 Alstom Citadis cars of a similar general design to the Eurotram. Strasbourg's tramway network, unlike those of some other towns and cities in France, is more of a grid (rather than being hub and spoke). In the city centre, all tracks are shared by at least two lines, and three lines share the tracks between the stations of Homme de Fer and Observatoire, which makes for easy interchange and increases service frequency in the city centre.

Bus and shuttle routes 

The Urban Community of Strasbourg bus network covers the entire area, and also serves the town of Kehl in Germany, opposite the Rhine from Strasbourg, via the Europe Bridge. There are more than twenty bus and shuttle routes. Most are operated by the CTS, but some are subcontracted to local companies. The network is integrated into the tramway lines, and does not go into the most central part of the city, which is reserved for pedestrians and trams.

The last major review of the system happened with the extensions to the tramway network in August 2007. A study looking at the entire bus system is scheduled for 2013.

Compagnie des transports du Bas-Rhin 

In 2008, the CTS established a joint venture with Transdev, Mugler and Striebig to operate  ("Network 67"). The Compagnie des transports du Bas-Rhin (CBTR) took over more than twenty routes under the auspices of the Conseil général du Bas-Rhin. Other vehicles remained the property of the companies that had bought them.

Vélhop 

Since 2010, Vélhop has been the bicycle hire service for the CUS, provided by the CTS.

Plans were that by the end of 2011, over  Vélhops could be hired from automatic stations, either inside shops or on specially-equipped buses.

Vehicles

Tramway 

In 2011, the CTS had 94 tramcars of three different types, all of which could run over all routes.

The trams move all over the network, although lines E and F are usually served by three-car trams because they are the least loaded

An update and upgrade of the Citadis 403 has been ordered in 2013, these 22 trams are fitted to be used on the German part of the network. More trams were ordered in early 2020 to get rid of the first batch of Eurotram from ABB.

Bus

Standard

Articulated

Charter buses 
The CTS subcontracts some routes to other operating companies: 21, 27 and 31, the three shuttles and school buses. The CTS does not own the vehicles used on these routes.

Standard 
GTS is using three Mercedes-Benz Citaro & Citaro Low-Entry, for the lines 27, 31 and school services.

Since 2018, LK Kunegel is using 17 S 415 LE from Setra for the lines 64, 71, 72, 73, 75 & 77.

Articulated 
In 2011, articulated buses were chartered by Kunegel, with five Van Hool AG300s used on school services, and by Transdev Alsace, which operated three Van Hool AG300s, four Mercedes-Benz Citaro Gs and a single Renault Agora L. These services were used on route 31 and school services.

Since the opening of the Kehl tram branch in 2017, there are no more articulated buses used by any charter.

Low-height buses and minibuses 
The CTS has no midibuses (reduced-capacity buses). Minibuses are used on shuttles run by GTS with some Mercedes-Benz Sprinter City.

Livery 

When the tramways start in 1877, first horse-drawn and since 1984 electrically powered, the livery was entirely green. But in 1907, a decision was taken to repaint the entire fleet and other infrastructure in ivory. The ivory livery lasted until the tramways were dismantled in 1960.

In the 1960s, the livery was predominantly blue, except for the grille and bumpers, which were red. But the company started to put new colours on their vehicles: white for the vehicle top and red-orange for the bottom, echoing the town's colours and those of the region of Alsace.

In the 1980s, the network consisted only of bus routes operated by a single model, the Renault SC10, and the livery was the same on every vehicle: cream on the top with red on the bottom. The suburban network was operated by some Saviem S53s in a livery of grey with a light gree-blue band. As new bus models appeared, at the start of the 1990s, the company slightly changed the livery; the white background stayed, but several red-orange bands reappeared on the vehicles.

When the tramway was reintroduced, the company completely rethought its visual identity. The whole of the urban network (bus and tram) was put in the same livery. So, on buses, the bottom was in dark green and the rest of the vehicle in dark grey. Between the two colours, there was a  band. On the trams, the theme stayed the same but underwent several minor changes: the green stayed at the bottom but to a lesser extent. In 2005, the delivery of the new Alstom Citadis 403 cars reduced the amount of green once again (with more prominence on each end of the car set), and white was by far the most prominent colour (only on the Citadis).

In 2011, when more new vehicles were delivered, the company again presented a new livery. It is entirely white, but vehicles are decorated by a different artist chosen annually. The 29 new natural gas-powered vehicles (14 articulated and 15 standard Irisbus Citelis units) delivered in 2011 were decorated by the artist Tomi Ungerer.

Depots 
The CTS has three depots, all in Strasbourg. Each of the depots is designated as a mixed "unit of production" (UP), which is taken from the first letter of the depot: UPC (Cronenbourg), UPE (Elsau) and UPK (Kibitzenau). They are all "mixed", and can handle both buses and trams (repair and maintenance shops and cleaning stations).

Cronenbourg 

The corporate headquarters is located in Strasbourg, in the Cronenbourg  quarter. The depot was built in 1931 and was renovated and enlarged between 1992 and 1994, to service the new tramway. Its official designation is UPC. In 2011, il was equipped to handle CNG-powered buses.

The depot also houses the company administration, and the central supervision ( (PCC, "Central Command Post") which co-ordinates the movements of the entire bus and tramway network. A single track connects the Rotonde station with the depot, and so allows trams to access the rest of the network.

Elsau 
The Elsau depot was created for the tramway network extension, to serve lines B and C. It was inaugurated in 2000. With the 2010 network restructuring, the depot took over the new line F but lost line C, which moved to Kibitzenau. It opened for business in September 1999. It has a compression station for natural gas.  Its official denomination is GPE. The depot can rapidly recharge gas-powered vehicles; the Strasbourg authorities want to increase the fleet of gas-powered rolling stock.

Kibitzenau 
The Kibitzenau depot is the newest, inaugurated in January 2006 as part of the 2007–08 tramway extensions. It replaced the previous depot at Neudorf. The station is "mixed", handling both buses and trams, and also has a natural gas compression station.

Its official designation is UPK.

Neudorf 
The Neudorf depot, designated UPN, was located at Aristide Briand. It was demolished in 2005–06, to be replaced by the Kibitzenau depot, since it was not able to handle trams.

Maintenance equipment 

The extent and frequency of the network means it needs continuous maintenance. The CTS keeps a fleet of maintenance vehicles for both the bus and tram networks.

Two lorries called  travel the tramway network each day, to get rid of foreign objects in the rail grooves. If there is a fault on the rolling stock or the fixed infrastructure, the CTS has a fleet of road-rail vehicles, such as tractors, a Unimog and several bulldozers.

For the bus network, the company uses tractors as tow trucks. In parallel, a fleet of minibuses (Renault Master, Renault Kangoo, and so on) are available to transport the mechanics and service staff around the entire network.

Maintenance equipment is not painted in the CTS livery: vehicles are white, with the company logo affixed. Vehicle storage is distributed between the three depots.

Notes

Sources

External links 
 
 

Transport in Strasbourg
Public transport operators in France